Industrial Union Convention may refer to:

First Convention of the Industrial Workers of the World, also known as the Industrial Union Convention, the founding convention of the Industrial Workers of the World
The founding convention of the Congress of Industrial Organizations, also known as the industrial union convention
Any convention by an industrial union